Daftabad-e Olya (also Romanized as Daftābād-e ‘Olyā; also known as Daftābād-e Bālā and Raftābād) is a village in Darmian Rural District, in the Central District of Darmian County, South Khorasan Province, Iran. At the 2006 census, its population was 70, in 15 families.

References 

Populated places in Darmian County